James Schmidt may refer to:
 James Schmidt (politician)
 James Schmidt (serial killer)